The Brave Bulls is a 1951 American drama film directed by Robert Rossen and written by John Bright. The film stars Mel Ferrer, Miroslava, Anthony Quinn, Eugene Iglesias, José Torvay and Charlita. The film was released on April 18, 1951 by Columbia Pictures.

Plot

Cast        
Mel Ferrer as Luis Bello
Miroslava as Linda de Calderon
Anthony Quinn as Raul Fuentes
Eugene Iglesias as Pepe Bello
José Torvay as Eladio Gomez
Charlita as Raquelita
Jose Luis Vasquez as Yank Delgado
Alfonso Alvirez as Loco Ruiz
Alfredo Aguilar as Pancho Perez
Francisco Balderas as Monkey Garcia
Felipe Mota as Jackdaw
Pepe López as Farique
Jose Meza as Little White
Vicente Cárdenas as Goyo Salinas
Manuel Orozco as Abundio de Lao
Estive Domínguez as Tacho 
Silviano Sánchez as Policarpe Cana
Francisco Reiguera as Lara
Eduardo Arozamena as Don Alberto Iriarte
Luis Corona as Rufino Vega
Esther Laquin as Señora Bello
Juan Assael as Alfredo Bello
Delfino Morales as Indio
Rita Conde as Lala
Ramón Díaz Meza as Don Tiburcio Balbuenna
Fanny Schiller as Mamacita
Fernando Del Valle as Don Felix Aldemas

References

External links 
 

1951 films
1950s English-language films
Columbia Pictures films
American drama films
1951 drama films
Films directed by Robert Rossen
Films scored by Mario Castelnuovo-Tedesco
American black-and-white films
1950s American films